Lipis River is a river of Pahang, Malaysia.

See also
 List of rivers of Malaysia

References

Rivers of Pahang
Rivers of Malaysia